MythBusters Jr. is a science entertainment television program created for the Science Channel and produced by Australia's Beyond Television Productions. The series is a spin-off of the TV show MythBusters and follows its premise of examining the validity of myths. It premiered on the Science network on January 2, 2019, and consisted of 10 episodes.

The show is hosted by Veteran MythBuster Adam Savage and has a cast of six children skilled in STEM topics.

There has not yet been an official announcement of whether the show will be renewed or not.

Cast

Main host 
 Adam Savage

Junior Mythbusters 
 Valerie Castillo – 15-year-old skilled builder and robotics expert with experience in CAD drawing and 3D printing.
 Elijah Horland – 12-year-old self-taught maker and programmer who started building computers at 9.
 Cannan Huey-You – 12-year-old with a background in coding and motion physics who dreams of being an astronaut.
 Jesse Lawless – 15-year-old car enthusiast who built a mini chopper by himself at age 12.
 Rachel Pizzolato – 14-year-old who's remodeled houses since she was young.
 Allie Weber – 13-year-old patent inventor recognized by 3M as one of the top 10 young scientists in the country.

Builders 
 Tamara Robertson – contestant and finalist of MythBusters: The Search.
 Jon Marcu

Episodes

References

External links 

 
 

 
2019 American television series debuts
2019 American television series endings
2019 Australian television series debuts
2019 Australian television series endings
American educational television series
American non-fiction television series
American television spin-offs
Australian educational television series
Australian non-fiction television series
Australian television spin-offs
Science Channel original programming
English-language television shows
Scientific skepticism mass media
Television series about children
Television series about teenagers
Television series about urban legends
Television series by Beyond Television Productions